A loading gauge is a diagram or physical structure that defines the maximum height and width dimensions in railway vehicles and their loads. Their purpose is to ensure that rail vehicles can pass safely through tunnels and under bridges, and keep clear of platforms, trackside buildings and structures. Classification systems vary between different countries, and gauges may vary across a network, even if the track gauge is uniform.

The term loading gauge can also be applied to the maximum size of road vehicles in relation to tunnels, overpasses and bridges, and doors into automobile repair shops, bus garages, filling stations, residential garages, multi-storey car parks and warehouses.

A related but separate gauge is the structure gauge, which sets limits to the extent that bridges, tunnels and other infrastructure can encroach on rail vehicles. The difference between these two gauges is called the clearance. The specified amount of clearance makes allowance for wobbling of rail vehicles at speed.

Overview

The loading gauge restricts the size of passenger coaches, goods wagons (freight cars) and shipping containers that can travel on a section of railway track. It varies across the world and often within a single railway system. Over time there has been a trend towards larger loading gauges and more standardization of gauges; some older lines have had their structure gauges enhanced by raising bridges, increasing the height and width of tunnels and making other necessary alterations. Containerisation and a trend towards larger shipping containers has led rail companies to increase structure gauges to compete effectively with road haulage.

The term "loading gauge" can also refer to a physical structure, sometimes using electronic detectors using light beams on an arm or gantry placed over the exit lines of goods yards or at the entry point to a restricted part of a network. The devices ensure that loads stacked on open or flat wagons stay within the height/shape limits of the line's bridges and tunnels, and prevent out-of-gauge rolling stock entering a stretch of line with a smaller loading gauge. Compliance with a loading gauge can be checked with a clearance car. In the past, these were simple wooden frames or physical feelers mounted on rolling stock. More recently, laser beams are used.

The loading gauge is the maximum size of rolling stock. It is distinct from the minimum structure gauge, which sets limits to the size of bridges and tunnels on the line, allowing for engineering tolerances and the motion of rail vehicles. The difference between the two is called the clearance. The terms "dynamic envelope" or "kinematic envelope" – which include factors such as suspension travel, overhang on curves (at both ends and middle) and lateral motion on the track – are sometimes used in place of loading gauge.

The height of platforms is also a consideration for the loading gauge of passenger trains. Where the two are not directly compatible, stairs may be required, which will increase loading times. Where long carriages are used at a curved platform, there will be gaps between the platform and the carriage door, causing risk. Problems increase where trains of several different loading gauges and train floor heights use (or even must pass without stopping at) the same platform.

The size of load that can be carried on a railway of a particular gauge is also influenced by the design of the rolling stock. Low-deck rolling stock can sometimes be used to carry taller  shipping containers on lower gauge lines although their low-deck rolling stock cannot then carry as many containers.

Rapid Transit (metro) railways generally have a very small loading gauge, which reduces the cost of tunnel construction. These systems only use their own specialised rolling stock.

Out of gauge 
Larger out-of-gauge loads can also sometimes be conveyed by taking one or more of the following measures:
 Operate at low speed, especially in places with limited clearance, such as platforms.
 Cross over from a track with inadequate clearance to another track with greater clearance, even if there is no signalling to allow this.
 Prevent operation of other trains on adjacent tracks.
 Use refuge loops to allow trains to operate on other tracks.
 Use of Schnabel cars (special rolling stock) that manipulate the load up and down or left and right to clear obstacles.
 Remove (and later replace) obstacles.
 Use gauntlet track to shift the train to side or center.
 For locomotives that are too heavy, ensure that fuel tanks are nearly empty.
 Turn off power in overhead wiring or in the third rail (use diesel locomotive)
 Permanently adapt a certain route to larger gauge if there is repeated need for such trains.

History
The loading gauge on the main lines of Great Britain, most of which were built before 1900, is generally smaller than in other countries. In mainland Europe, the slightly larger Berne gauge (Gabarit passe-partout international, PPI) was agreed to in 1913 and came into force in 1914. As a result, British trains have noticeably and considerably smaller loading gauges and, for passenger trains, smaller interiors, despite the track being standard gauge, which is in line with much of the world.

This often results in increased costs for purchasing new trainsets or locomotives as they must be specifically designed for the existing British network, rather than being purchased "off-the-shelf". For example, the new trains for HS2 have a 50% premium applied to the "classic compatible" sets that will be "compatible" with the current (or "classic") rail network loading gauge as well as the HS2 line. The "classic compatible" trainsets will cost £40million per trainset whereas the HS2-only stock (built to European loading gauge and only suitable to operate on HS2 lines) will cost £27M per trainset despite the HS2-only stock being physically larger.

It was recognized even during the nineteenth century that this would pose problems and countries whose railroads had been built or upgraded to a more generous loading gauge pressed for neighboring countries to upgrade their own standards. This was particularly true in continental Europe where the Nordic countries and Germany with their relatively generous loading gauge wanted their cars and locomotives to be able to run throughout the standard gauge network without being limited to a small size. France, which at the time had the most restrictive loading gauge ultimately compromised giving rise to Berne gauge which came into effect just before World War I.

Military railways were often built to particularly high standards, especially after the American Civil War and the Franco-Prussian War showed the importance of railroads in troop transport as well as mobilization. The Kaiserreich was particularly active in the construction of military railways which were often built with great expense to be as flat, straight and permissive in loading gauge as possible while bypassing major urban areas, making those lines of little use to civilian traffic, particularly civilian passenger traffic. However, all those aforementioned factors have in some cases led to the subsequent abandoning of those railroads.

Standard loading gauges for standard track gauge lines

International Union of Railways (UIC) Gauge

The International Union of Railways (UIC) has developed a standard series of loading gauges named A, B, B+ and C.
 PPI – the predecessor of the UIC gauges had the maximum dimensions  with an almost round roof top.
 UIC A: The smallest (slightly larger than PPI gauge). Maximum dimensions .
 UIC B: Most of the high-speed TGV tracks in France are built to UIC B. Maximum dimensions .
 UIC B+: New structures in France are being built to UIC B+. Up to  has a shape to accommodate tractor-trailers loaded with ISO containers.
 UIC C: The Central European gauge. In Germany and other central European countries, the railway systems are built to UIC C gauges, sometimes with an increment in the width, allowing Scandinavian trains to reach German stations directly, originally built for Soviet freight cars. Maximum dimensions .

Europe

European standards

In the European Union, the UIC directives were supplanted by ERA Technical Specifications for Interoperability (TSI) of European Union in 2002, which has defined a number of recommendations to harmonize the train systems.

The designation of a GB+ loading gauge refers to the plan to create a pan-European freight network for ISO containers and trailers with loaded ISO containers. These container trains (piggy-back trains) fit into the B envelope with a flat top so that only minor changes are required for the widespread structures built to loading gauge B on continental Europe. Currently, some structures on the British Isles are extended to fit with GB+ as well, where the first lines to be rebuilt start at the Channel Tunnel.

Owing to their historical legacies, many member states' railways do not conform to the TSI specification. For example, Britain's role at the forefront of railway development in the 19th century has condemned it to the small infrastructure dimensions of that era. Conversely, the s of countries that were satellites of the former Soviet Union are much larger than the TSI specification. Other than for GB+, they are not likely to be retrofitted, given the enormous cost and disruption that would be entailed.

Double-decker carriages

A specific example of the value of these loading gauges is that they permit double decker passenger carriages.

Great Britain
Great Britain has (in general) the most restrictive loading gauge (relative to track gauge) in the world. That is a legacy of the British railway network being the world's oldest, and of having been built by a plethora of different private companies, each with different standards for the width and height of trains. After nationalisation, a standard static gauge W5 was defined in 1951 that would virtually fit everywhere in the network. The W6 gauge is a refinement of W5, and the W6a changed the lower body to accommodate third-rail electrification. While the upper body is rounded for W6a with a static curve, there is an additional small rectangular notch for W7 to accommodate the transport of  ISO containers, and the W8 loading gauge has an even larger notch spanning outside of the curve to accommodate the transport of  ISO containers. While W5 to W9 are based on a rounded roof structure, those for W10 to W12 define a flat line at the top and, instead of a strict static gauge for the wagons, their sizes are derived from dynamic gauge computations for rectangular freight containers.

Network Rail uses a W loading gauge classification system of freight transport ranging from W6A (smallest) through W7, W8, W9, W9Plus, W10, W11 to W12 (largest).

In addition, gauge C1 provides a specification for standard coach stock, gauge C3 for longer Mark 3 coaching stock, gauge C4 for Pendolino stock and gauge UK1 for high-speed rail. There is also a gauge for locomotives. The size of container that can be conveyed depends both upon the size of the load that can be conveyed and the design of the rolling stock.

 W6a: Available over the majority of the British rail network.
Larger than UIC A.
 W11: Little used but larger than UIC B.
Recommended clearance for new structures, such as bridges and tunnels.
 UIC GC: Channel Tunnel and Channel Tunnel Rail Link to London; with proposals to enable GB+ northwards from London via an upgraded Midland Main Line.

A strategy was adopted in 2004 to guide enhancements of loading gauges and in 2007 the freight route utilisation strategy was published. That identified a number of key routes where the loading gauge should be cleared to W10 standard and, where structures are being renewed, that W12 is the preferred standard.

Height and width of containers that can be carried on GB gauges (height by width). Units as per source material.
 W9:  by 
 W10:  by 
 W11:  by 
 W12:  by

Tube lines
 City and South London Railway was built with tunnels of only  diameter. Enlarged for Northern line to 
This makes Central line trains unique on the London Underground system because, although the loading gauge of the rolling stock is the same as the other 'tube' lines, the smaller size of the tunnel requires that the positive conductor rail is  higher than on all other lines.

A Parliamentary committee headed by James Stansfeld then reported on 23 May 1892, "The evidence submitted to the Committee on the question of the diameter of the underground tubes containing the railways has been distinctly in favour of a minimum diameter of ". After that, all tube lines were at least that size.

 Piccadilly line with tunnels of 

Sweden
Sweden uses shapes similar to the Central European loading gauge but trains allowed to be much wider.

There are three main classes in use (width × height):
Similar to OPS-NL (Netherlands), Victorian (Australia) and Chinese loading gauges.
Similar to Norwegian loading gauge.
Similar to OPS-GC (Netherlands) loading gauge.

Malmbanan north of Kiruna was the first electrified railway line in Sweden and has limited height clearance (SE-B) because of snow shelters. On the rest of the network belonging to Trafikverket, the structure gauge accepts cars built to SE-A and thus accepts both cars built to UIC GA and GB. This is generally acceptable as the extra width is above normal platform height, but it means that they can not use the high platforms that Arlanda Express uses (Arlanda Central Station has normal clearances). The greater width allows sleeping cars in which tall people can sleep with straight legs and feet, which is not the case on the continent.

Netherlands
The trains are wider allowing for  width similar to Sweden. About one third of the Dutch passenger trains use bilevel rail cars. However, Dutch platforms are much higher than Swedish ones.

Betuweroute 
 Betuweroute:  to allow double stacked container trains in the future. The present overhead line does not allow this height, as it has to follow standards.

Channel Tunnel
 Channel Tunnel:

North America

Freight

The American loading gauge for freight cars on the North American rail network is generally based on standards set by the Association of American Railroads (AAR) Mechanical Division. The most widespread standards are AAR Plate-B and AAR Plate-C, but higher loading gauges have been introduced on major routes outside urban centers to accommodate rolling stock that makes better economic use of the network, such as auto carriers, hi-cube boxcars, and double-stack container loads.

Listed here are the maximum heights and widths for cars. However, the specification in each plate shows a car cross section that is chamfered at the top and bottom, meaning that a compliant car is not permitted to fill an entire rectangle of the maximum height and width.

Technically, Plate B is still the maximum height and truck center combination and the circulation of Plate C is somewhat restricted. This means that most, if not all, lines are now designed for a higher loading gauge. The width of these extra-height cars is covered by Plates C-1, D-1 and D-2.

All the Class I rail companies have invested in longterm projects to increase clearances to allow double stack freight. The mainline North American rail networks of the Union Pacific, the BNSF, the Canadian National, and the Canadian Pacific, have already been upgraded to AAR Plate K. This represents over 60% of the Class I rail network.

Passenger service 

In the 1940s and 1950s, the American passenger car loading gauge was increased to a  height throughout most of the country outside the Northeast, to accommodate dome cars and later Superliners and other bilevel commuter trains. Bilevel and Hi-level passenger cars have been in use since the 1950s, and new passenger equipment with a height of  has been built for use in Alaska and the Canadian Rockies.

New York City Subway 
The New York City Subway is an amalgamation of three former constituent companies, and while all are standard gauge, inconsistencies in loading gauge prevent cars from the former BMT and IND systems (B Division) from running on the lines of the former IRT system (A Division), and vice versa. Taking this into account, all maintenance vehicles are built to IRT loading gauge so that they can be operated over the entire network, and employees are responsible for minding the gap.

Another inconsistency is the maximum permissible railcar length.

Boston (MBTA)
The MBTA's rapid transit system is composed of four unique subway lines; while all lines are standard gauge, inconsistencies in loading gauge, electrification, and platform height prevent trains on one line from being used on another. The first segment of the Green Line (known as the Tremont Street Subway) was constructed in 1897 to take the streetcars off Boston's busy downtown streets. When the Blue Line opened in 1904, it only ran streetcar services; the line was converted to rapid transit in 1924 due to high passenger loads, but the tight clearances in the tunnel under the Boston Harbor required narrower and shorter rapid transit cars. The Orange Line was originally built in 1901 to accommodate heavy rail transit cars of higher capacity than streetcars. The Red Line was opened in 1912, designed to handle what were for a time the largest underground transit cars in the world.

Los Angeles (LACMTA)
The Los Angeles Metro Rail system is an amalgamation of two former constituent companies, the Los Angeles County Transportation Commission and the Southern California Rapid Transit District; both of those companies were responsible for planning the initial system. It is composed of two heavy rail subway lines and several light rail lines with subway sections; while all lines are standard gauge, inconsistencies in electrification and loading gauge prohibit the light rail trains from operating on the heavy rail lines, and vice versa. The LACTC-planned Blue Line was opened in 1990 and partially operates on the route of the Pacific Electric interurban railroad line between downtown Los Angeles and Long Beach, which used overhead electrification and street-running streetcar vehicles. The SCRTD-planned Red Line (later split into the Red and Purple lines) was opened in 1993 and was designed to handle high-capacity heavy rail transit cars that would operate underground. Shortly after the Red Line began operations, the LACTC and the SCRTD merged to form the LACMTA, which became responsible for planning and construction of the Green, Gold, Expo, and K lines, as well as the Purple Line Extension and the Regional Connector.

Asia 

China 
China is building numerous new railways in sub-Saharan Africa and Southeast Asia (such as in Kenya and Laos), and these are being built to "Chinese Standards". This presumably means track gauge, loading gauge, structure gauge, couplings, brakes, electrification, etc.

Japan, standard gauge 

Translation of legend: 

Trains on the Shinkansen network operate on  track and have a loading gauge of  maximum width and  maximum height. This allows the operation of double-deck high-speed trains.

Mini Shinkansen (former conventional  narrow gauge lines that have been regauged into ) and some private railways in Japan (including some lines of the Tokyo subway and all of the Osaka Metro) also use standard gauge; however, their loading gauges are different.

The rest of Japan's system is discussed under narrow gauge, below.

Hong Kong

South Korea 

Philippines 
There is currently no uniform standard for loading gauges in the country and both loading gauges and platform heights vary by rail line.

Africa 
Some of the new railways being built in Africa allow for double-stacked containers, the height of which is about  depending on the height of each container  or  plus the height of the deck of the flat wagon about  totalling .

Australia 
The narrow widths have mostly been eliminated, except, for example, at the mainline platforms at Gosford railway station and some sidings.

The Commonwealth Railways adopted the national standard of  when they were established in 1912, although no connection with New South Wales was made until 1970.

Track centres from Penrith railway station to Mount Victoria railway station and Gosford and Wyong have been gradually widened to suit.

The 1968 built Kwinana-Kalgoorlie standard gauge railway in Western Australia was built with a loading gauge of 12 ft (3.66 m) wide and 20 ft (6.1 m) tall to allow for trailer on flatcar (TOFC) traffic.

Broad gauge

Indian Gauge 
 Indian Railways has a maximum passenger loading gauge of 3,660 mm and a freight loading gauge of 3,250 mm, with development allowing a loading gauge of 3,710 mm. 
 Sri Lanka Railways has a loading gauge of between 3,200 mm and 4,267 mm.

Russian Gauge

The Russian loading gauges are defined in standard GOST 9238 (ГОСТ 9238–83, ГОСТ 9238–2013) with the current 2013 standard named "Габариты железнодорожного подвижного состава и приближения строений" (construction of rolling stock clearance diagrams [official English title]). It was accepted by the Interstate Council for Standardization, Metrology and Certification to be valid in Russia, Belarus, Moldova, Ukraine, Uzbekistan and Armenia.

The standard defines static envelopes for trains on the national network as T, Tc and Tpr. The static profile 1-T is the common standard on the complete 1520 mm rail network including the CIS and Baltic states. The structure clearance is given as S, Sp and S250. There is a tradition that structure clearance is much bigger than the common train sizes. For international traffic, the standard references the kinematic envelope for GC and defines a modified GCru for its high-speed trains. For other international traffic, there are 1-T, 1-VM, 0-VM, 02-VM and 03-VMst/03-VMk for the trains and 1-SM for the structure clearance.

The latter matches with the TSI height in Central Europe. That matches with the Tc, Tpr and the universal 1-T loading gauge.

Iberian gauge

Irish Gauge

Ireland and Nortern  Ireland

Australia

Brazil

Narrow gauge 

Narrow gauge railways generally have a smaller loading gauge than standard gauge ones, and this is a major reason for cost savings rather than the railgauge itself.

Great Britain

Ffestiniog Railway 

 gauge = 
 width (brakevan mirrors) = 
 width (brakevan body) = 
 height = 
 length = (carriage)

Lynton and Barnstaple Railway 

 gauge = 
 Lyn (locomotive) over headstocks
 length = 
 width = 
 height = 
 Passenger
 length = 
 width over steps = 
 height =

Japan, narrow gauge 

Translation of legend: 

The Japanese national network operated by Japan Railways Group employs narrow gauge . These include the Chūō Main Line west of Takao, the Minobu Line, and the Yosan Main Line west of Kan'onji ( height). Nevertheless, advances in pantograph technology have largely eliminated the need for separate rolling stock in these areas.

There are many private railway companies in Japan and the loading gauge is different for each company.

South Africa 

The South African national network employs  gauge.

New Zealand 

The railways use  gauge.

Other 
 gauge  for the United Kingdom, Sierra Leone
 minimum radius 
 width  (see Everard Calthrop)
 wagon length freight  over headstocks
 wagon length passenger  over headstocks
 tank engine length  over headstocks

Structure gauge 

The structure gauge, which refers to the dimensions of the lowest and narrowest bridges or tunnels of the track, complements the loading gauge, which specifies the tallest and widest allowable vehicle dimensions. There is a gap between the structure gauge and loading gauge, and some allowance needs to be made for the dynamic movement of vehicles (sway) to avoid mechanical interference causing equipment and structural damage.

Out of gauge 
While it may be true that trains of a particular loading gauge can travel freely over tracks of a matching structure gauge, in practice, problems can still occur. In an accident at Moston station, an old platform not normally used by freight trains was hit by a train that wasn't within its intended W6a gauge because two container fastenings were hanging over the side. Analysis showed that the properly configured train would have passed safely even though the platform couldn't handle the maximum design sway of W6a. Accepting reduced margins for old construction is normal practice if there have been no incidents but if the platform had met modern standards with greater safety margin the out of gauge train would have passed without incident.

Trains larger than the loading gauge, but not too large, can operate if the structure gauge is carefully measured, and the trip is subject to various special regulations.

Gallery

See also

 Berne gauge
 Bridge
 Clearance car
 Clearance space
 Cut
 Platform gap
 Over weight
 Railway platform height
 Ride height
 Structure gauge
 Tunnel

References

Further reading 
 Jane's World Railways yearbook contains many though not all loading gauge diagrams.

External links
 2002/732/EC: Commission Decision of 30 May 2002 concerning the technical specification for interoperability relating to the infrastructure subsystem of the trans-European high-speed rail system
 Loading Gauges at The Self Site 
 Railway industrial Clearance Association
 British Track Gauge & Loading Gauge 
 Railway line clearances and car dimensions including weight limitations of railroads in the United States, Canada, Mexico and Cuba.
 AAR plates with UIC
 AAR "plate" loading gauge diagrams compared to UIC (pdf & Autocad)

Permanent way
Rail loading gauge